Ariel López Padilla (born August 12, 1962 in Guadalajara, Jalisco, Mexico) is a Mexican actor. He is best known for his acting in many telenovelas such as Gata Salvaje, Pecados Ajenos, Inocente de ti. Ariel Lopez works for most famous telenovelas productions principally for Telemundo and Venevision, but also has some credits in Televisa and TV Azteca. He lives in Miami, U.S.

When young, he showed an interest for acting. Dunia Zaldívar, his aunt and who already counted with some years as an actress, shared with him acting techniques, selected literature, examples and other guides that introduced him formally and with a lot of affection to this art.

He studied the career of performance arts at the Universidad de Guadalajara and participated in several productions where he quickly became distinguished, especially in comic papers. Later he was hired as a dancer by the Instituto Nacional de Bellas Artes (I.N.B.A.) in Mexico City. He has taken courses and workshops in Mexico, Cuba, France, Germany, United States and the former USSR, where he auditioned for the Bolshoi Ballet  in the capital, Moscow.

He gave up at I.N.B.A. as a dancer to participate in the production of Cats The Musical. He enrolled to Televisa's Centro de Educación Artística. Ariel was discovered by Eugenio Cobo, CEA's Principal, allowing him to have his first sporadic but constant appearances in multiple TV shows and eventually to take his first main papers in soap operas like La Pícara Soñadora (Dir. Raquel Parot, Prod. Valentin Pimstein) y De frente al sol (Dir. Miguel Corcega, Prod. Carla Estrada).

His jump to the fame came with the soap opera Corazón salvaje, the third adaptation to the TV screen of the novel written by Caridad Bravo Adams, directed by Alberto Cortez and produced by José Rendón.

Personal life
Ariel currently lives in Cuernavaca. He is married to a show business executive. He was 
previously married to Mariana Levy who died from a heart attack after a failed armed robbery attempt in Mexico City. With Mariana he had the opportunity to become father of a girl: María (born on March 28, 1996).

Filmography
Selected works:
 Los Ricos Tambien Lloran (2022) ... Efraín Torres
 La Bandida (TV series) (2019).... Dr Avila
 Nada personal (2017) .... Ricardo Trejo
 Rosario Tijeras (2016) .... Camilio Echegaray
 Voltea pa' que te enamores (2014) .... Aurelio Botel
 Secretos de familia (2013) .... Vicente Quiroz
 Los Rey (2012) .... Guillermo Rey San Vicente "Memo"
 A Corazón Abierto (2012) ....
 Huérfanas (2011) .... Cesar Davola
 Quiéreme tonto (2010) .... Lázaro Cruz
 Pecados ajenos (2008) .... Rogelio Mercenario
 Bajo las riendas del amor (2007) .... Joaquin Corcuera
 Tierra de pasiones (2006) .... Javier Ortigoza
 Decisiones (2005) .... Libardo
 Soñar no cuesta nada (2005) .... Jonás Reyes
 Inocente de ti (2004) .... Licenciado Gómez Riveroll
 Ángel Rebelde (2004) .... Ernesto Lezama, Rómulo Lezama
 Gata Salvaje (2002) .... Patricio Rivera
 Secreto de amor (2001) .... Dr. Ricardo Sandoval
 Carita de ángel (2000) .... Adrián
 Alma rebelde (1999) .... Damian Montoro
 Soñadoras (1998) .... Enrique Bernal
 Te sigo amando (1996) .... Doctor
 Leonela (1997) .... Damián
 Pobre niña rica (1995) .... Julio
 María la del Barrio (1995) .... Dr. Daniel Ordonez
 Caminos cruzados (1994) .... César Augusto
 Prisionera de amor (1994)
 Corazón salvaje (1993) .... Andrés Alcázar y Valle
 Clarisa (1993) .... Gaston
 Televiteatros (1993)
 De frente al sol (1992)
 La Pícara Soñadora (1991)

References

External links

1962 births
Living people
Mexican male telenovela actors
Male actors from Guadalajara, Jalisco
Mexican emigrants to the United States